Under Her Nose (Pho Ban Chai Kla Story) is a Thai comedy-drama television series, nominated Best Comedy Programme Asian Television Awards 2017. It aired on Saturday 10:15 - 11:15 a.m. on Workpoint TV starting 22 April, ending 4 November in 2017.

Plot

Cast 

Saharat Sangkapreecha as Sun
 Jennifer Kim as Khim
 Thanakrit 'Wan' Panichwid as Win
 Sakonrat 'Four' Woraurai as Summer
 Benjapol 'Golf' Cheuyaroon as Dr. Thep
 Lapassalan Jiravechsoontornkul as Thaenchai
 Nachat 'Nikky' Chanphan as Tar

Guest Cast 
 Suraphon Poonpiriya ( EP.01)
 Sirapassara Sintrakarnphol (Pam Gaia) ( EP.02 , EP.03 , EP.06 ,EP.11)  as Kookkik
 Nida Phatcharawiraphong (EP.03) as Cris
 Irin Sriklaeo (EP.04) as Angkhana
 Phanisa Udomrueakiat (Nun Gaia) (EP.04 , EP.14) as Khim (young)
 Maneenuch Smerasut (EP.05, EP.06) as Mi
 Pan Plutaek (EP.05) as Doctor Pup
 Bon Jakobsen (EP.07 , EP.25) as Wi; Win's sister
 Supoj Chancharoen (EP.08, EP.09) as Jo
 Intiporn Tamsukin (EP.10) as Naen
 Soodthiphong Thadphithakkoun (EP.13 , EP.22) as Chat
 Atthama Chiwanitchaphan (EP.14) as Jen
Supakorn Kitsuwon (EP.14 , EP.20 , EP.26) as Tiger
 Pharanyu Rojanawuthitham (EP.14) as Chak
Penpak Sirikul (EP.15) as Nida
 Wongsakorn Rassamitat (EP.15) as Ton
 Natcha Janthapan (EP.16) as Daenthai
 Jintanutda Lummakanon (EP.17 , EP.19) as Phirin
 Jularat Hanrungroj (EP.17) as Kat
 Komane Ruangkitrattanakul (EP.17) as Jo
 Sudthirak Srapwicjit (EP.18 , EP.19)
 Pramote Thianchaikerdsilp (EP.21) as Bell
 Akkarin Akaranithimetrath (EP.21) as Songklot
 Yokyek Choenyim (EP.21) as Micro
 Pongpitch Preechaborisuthikul (EP.21)
 Primrata Dej-Udom (EP.22 , EP.24) as Grace
 Nook Smat (The Voice Thailand) (EP.22)
 Jaidee Deedeedee (EP.23)
 Itthipat Thanit (EP.23 , EP.24) as Bom
 Kaimuk Sup'tar (EP.24) as Aunt Noi

Episode List

Opening Theme 

 Chop Due - Supakorn Kitsuwon
 Chop Due - Thanakrit 'Wan' Panichwid (Feat. Sakonrat 'Four' Woraurai)

Award 

 Nominated Best Comedy Programme Asian Television Awards 2017

Trivia 

Saharat Sangkapreecha (Kong) and Jennifer Kim (Kim) is two coaches on the singing contest The Voice Thailand.
All of main casts; Saharat Sangkapreecha, Jennifer Kim, Thanakrit Panichwid, Sakonrat Woraurai, Benjapol Cheuyaroon and Nachat Chanphan are singers.
The name of Win's former band is Boys' Generation from Girls' Generation.

References

External links 

 UNDER HER NOSE -Trailer
Facebook Fanpage Workpointdrama
พ่อบ้านใจกล้าสตอรี (รายการเก่า)
เจนนิเฟอร์ คิ้ม ปลุกความอิจฉาสาวๆ ในซีรี่ย์ “พ่อบ้านใจกล้าสตอรี” เริ่มวันเสาร์ที่ 22 เมษายนนี้ 10.15 น. ช่องเวิร์คพอยท์ หมายเลข 23
คู่จิ้นรุ่นใหญ่!! ก้อง คิ้ม ลงจอประกบคู่สุดหวาน ใน พ่อบ้านใจกล้าสตอรี
สาวๆอย่าอิจฉา คิ้ม บอกเลย คุ้ม! เล่นเข้าขา ก้อง เหมือนอยู่กินกันมานาน
เรื่องย่อ "พ่อบ้านใจกล้า สตอรี"

Thai drama television series
2017 Thai television series debuts
2017 Thai television series endings
2010s comedy television series
Television shows set in Bangkok
Comedy-drama television series
Thai romantic comedy television series
Workpoint TV original programming